The Rural BC Party is a minor political party in British Columbia, Canada. The party was co-founded in 2018 by Houston councillor Jonathan Van Barneveld and then-mayor of Telkwa Darcy Repen. The party's stated objective is to provide representation and support to people living in rural areas of British Columbia, believing that the province's more major parties focus excessively on urban areas.

Policies 
The Rural BC Party's main focus is on representing the needs of British Columbians in rural areas, with the party itself stating that the province's main political parties focus far too heavily on urban areas, such as those around Vancouver, Victoria, and Kelowna. One of the Rural BC Party's goals is to elect members to the Legislative Assembly representing a constituency rather than a party.

Electoral performance 

At the Rural BC Party's inception in 2018, the party intended to nominated candidates for the planned 2021 election only in the 23 rural ridings (e.g. those outside of the Greater Vancouver, Fraser Valley, southern Vancouver Island, Nanaimo and Kelowna). In 2018, some analysts theorized that the Rural BC Party's creation could pose a threat to the support of the British Columbia Liberal Party in rural areas.

When a snap election was called by British Columbia premier John Horgan in September 2020 however, the party struggled to organize candidates in the time given. The party's only nomination in the 2020 provincial general election was within the Stikine electoral district with one of the party's co-founders, Darce Repen. The Rural BC Party received 754 votes within the Stikine riding, earning them 10.42% of the popular vote there.

Provincial elections

See also 

 BC Ecosocialists
 B.C. Vision
 Rural Party (UK)

References

External links

Provincial political parties in British Columbia
Political parties established in 2018
2018 establishments in British Columbia